Chesterpoul Lyngdoh is an Indian professional footballer who plays as a midfielder for Bengaluru United.

Career

Early career
Born in Meghalaya, Lyngdoh began his footballing career playing for his school team in the Subroto Cup. He was then part of the youth set-up of local Shillong-based club Nangkiew Irat, playing for them in the local state under-19 league. After impressing in the under-19 league, Lyngdoh was selected to join the Pune F.C. Academy.

Churchill Brothers (loan)
After the Pune F.C. Academy was bought out by Indian Super League side Pune City, Lyngdoh was loaned out to Churchill Brothers, who then played in the Goa Professional League. He played for the club during the 2016 GPL season. He was then included in the squad for Churchill Brothers' upcoming I-League season. He made his professional debut for the club on 18 January 2017 in the league against East Bengal. He came on as an 88th-minute substitute for Brandon Fernandes as Churchill Brothers lost 2–0. The 19-year-old played a total of 1121 minutes for Churchill Brothers and scored three goals, two of them were the winners against Bengaluru FC and Mohun Bagan.

Mohun Bagan
In July 2017, Mohun Bagan signed lyngdoh for the upcoming Calcutta Football League and i-League seasons. He made his debut for the club in the 2017–18 Calcutta Premier Division match against Southern Samity.He scored his first goal for the club in a 3–0 win against Railway fc. Later he started for Bagan in their 2017–18 I-League season opener match against Minerva Punjab. However he only made 3 appearances for the club and eventually he was released after the I-League season.

Pune City'B' / Pune City
In March 2018 he returned to Pune City. He was included in the Pune City Reserves squad for the 2017–18 I-League 2nd Division. He made his debut for the club in a 0–0 draw against Real Kashmir. He scored three goals from 6 matches which includes a brace against Lonestar Kashmir. His performance for the reserve side caught the eyes of Pune City head coach Ranko Popovic and was included in the first team's squad for 2018 Indian Super Cup.

Lyngdoh made his debut for the first team of Pune city  on 4 April 2018 coming on as a 74th-minute substitute for Ashique Kuruniyan against Shillong lajong; Pune city lost 2–3.

Churchill Brothers
In 2019 season he joined Churchill brothers. He was included in the Churchill' squad for 2018–19 Goa Professional League. However, in the middle of the season first team coach Petre Gigiu included him into the I-League squad. He made a total of 10 Appearances for the club in the 2018–19 I-League Season.

Career statistics

Notes

Honours
Real Kashmir
IFA Shield: 2020

References

External links
Profile

Living people
People from Meghalaya
Indian footballers
Pune FC players
FC Pune City players
Churchill Brothers FC Goa players
Association football midfielders
Footballers from Meghalaya
Goa Professional League players
I-League players
1997 births
Real Kashmir FC players
Indian Super League players
Mohun Bagan AC players
I-League 2nd Division players
Sudeva Delhi FC players
Rangdajied United F.C. players
FC Bengaluru United players